Libero Liberati (20 September 1926 – 5 March 1962) was an Italian motorcycle racer and the 1957 500cc Grand Prix World Champion.

Liberati was born in Terni. He became famous in his country, winning the Italian championship in 1948. Two years later Moto Guzzi called him to race in the 500cc World Championship, where he took part in a single race. The same happened the following year with Gilera. Liberati scored his first points in the World Championship in 1953, and his first race victory came in 1956 in the 350cc class.

In 1957, Liberati won the 500cc World Championship, scoring a total of four victories. He also won a race in the 350cc class. However, at the end of the season, a dispute with the Gilera factory left him without a ride. Two years later Moto Morini gave him the opportunity to race again, this time in the 250cc class.

Motorcycle Grand Prix results

(key) (Races in italics indicate fastest lap)

References 

Italian motorcycle racers
500cc World Championship riders
350cc World Championship riders
250cc World Championship riders
People from Terni
Road incident deaths in Italy
1926 births
1962 deaths
Sportspeople from the Province of Terni

500cc World Riders' Champions